Eiji Tsuburaya (1901–1970) was a Japanese special effects director and filmmaker. Popularly known as the "Father of Tokusatsu" for his techniques in special effects, Tsuburaya started his career in the Japanese film industry as a cinematographer for a number of drama and jidaigeki films in the early 20th century. During the 1950s and 1960s, Tsuburaya worked on several Toho kaiju films, which earned him fame as a special effects pioneer. 

In 1919, his first job in the film industry was as an assistant cinematographer at the Nihon Katsudou Shashin Kabushiki-gaisha (Nihon Cinematograph Company) in Kyoto, which later became better known as Nikkatsu. After serving as a member of the correspondence staff to the military from 1921 to 1923, he joined Ogasaware Productions. He was ahead cameraman on Hunchback of Enmeiin (Enmeiin no Semushiotoko), and served as an assistant cameraman on Teinosuke Kinugasa's ground-breaking 1925 film, A Page of Madness. 

He joined Shochiku Kyoto Studios in 1926 and became a full-time cameraman there in 1927. He began using and creating innovative filming techniques during this period, including the first use of a camera crane in Japanese film. In the 1930 film Chohichiro Matsudaira, he created a film illusion by super-imposition. Thus began the work for which he would become known--tokusatsu, or special visual effects.

As head of Toho's Visual Effects Department (which was known as the "Special Arts Department" until 1961), which he established in 1939, he supervised an average of sixty craftsmen, technicians, and cameramen. It was here that he became part of the team, along with director Ishirō Honda and producer Tomoyuki Tanaka, that created the first Godzilla film in 1954, and were dubbed by Toho's advertising department as "The Golden Trio".

The tremendous success of Godzilla led Toho to produce a series of science fiction films, films introducing new monsters, and further films involving the Godzilla character itself. The most critically and popularly successful of these films were those involving the team of Tsuburaya, Honda, and Tanaka, along with the fourth member of the Godzilla team, composer Akira Ifukube. Tsuburaya continued producing the special effects for non-kaiju films like The H-Man (1958), and The Last War (1961), and won another Japanese Movie Technique Award for his work in the 1957 science-fiction film The Mysterians. He also won another award in 1959 for the creation of the "Toho Versatile System," an optical printer for widescreen pictures, which he built in-house and first used on The Three Treasures in 1959. (Tsuburaya was continually frustrated by both the poor state of equipment he was forced to use, and Toho's money-pinching that prevented the acquisition of new motion picture technologies.)

Filmography
During his 50-year career, Tsuburaya worked on approximately 250 films in total.

Film and television

References

Sources

External links

Eiji Tsuburaya on the Japanese Movie Database

Japanese filmographies
Director filmographies